The Montpelier Historic District in Montpelier in southeast Idaho is a  historic district which was listed on the National Register of Historic Places im 1978.

It includes four buildings:  the city hall, a high school, the high school's gymnasium, and an LDS church.

References

Historic districts on the National Register of Historic Places in Idaho
Neoclassical architecture in Idaho
Streamline Moderne architecture in the United States
Buildings and structures completed in 1916
Bear Lake County, Idaho